Houghton-le-Spring was a county constituency of the House of Commons of the Parliament of the United Kingdom from 1885 to 1983. Centred on the town of Houghton-le-Spring, now part of the City of Sunderland, it elected one Member of Parliament (MP) by the first-past-the-post system of election.

History

Creation 
The constituency was created for the 1885 general election by the Redistribution of Seats Act 1885 as one of eight new single-member divisions of the county of Durham, replacing the two 2-member seats of North Durham and South Durham. The seat included the towns of Houghton-le-Spring, Hetton-le-Hole and Seaham and areas to the south and west of the borough of Sunderland. The majority now lies within the City of Sunderland in the metropolitan county of Tyne and Wear.

Boundaries

1885–1918 

 The Sessional Divisions of Houghton-le-Spring, Sunderland and Seaham Harbour (part); and
 The Municipal Borough of Sunderland

NB included only non-resident freeholders in the parliamentary borough of Sunderland.

See map on Vision of Britain website.

1918–1950 

 The Urban District of Houghton-le-Spring;
 the Rural Districts of South Shields and Sunderland; and
 part of the Rural District of Houghton-le-Spring.

Rural/coastal areas between South Shields and Sunderland, including the Boldons, transferred from Jarrow.  Lost Hetton-le-Hole to the new Durham Division of County Durham and Seaham to the new Seaham Division.

1950–1955 

 The Urban Districts of Houghton-le-Spring and Seaham; and
 the Rural District of Sunderland.

Seaham (including Seaham Harbour) transferred back from the abolished Seaham Division. Lost areas to the Borough Constituencies of South Shields, Sunderland North and Sunderland South as a result of the expansion of the respective County Boroughs. Remaining northern areas, largely comprising the Urban District of Boldon (which had largely succeeded the abolished Rural District of South Shields), transferred to Jarrow.

1955–1974 

 The Urban Districts of Houghton-le-Spring and Seaham; and
 the Rural District of Sunderland except the parts of the parishes of Ford, Herrington, Hylton, and Silksworth added to the County Borough of Sunderland by the Sunderland Extension Act 1950.

1974–1983 

 The Urban Districts of Hetton, Houghton-le-Spring, and Seaham; and
 in the Rural District of Easington, the parishes of Burdon, Cold Hesledon, Dalton-le-Dale, East Murton, Seaton with Slingley, and Warden Law.

The Urban District of Hetton transferred back from Durham and northern parts of the Rural District of Easington, including East Murton, transferred from Easington. Parts comprising the former Rural District of Sunderland, which had been largely absorbed by the County Borough, were transferred to Sunderland North (Hylton) and Sunderland South (Ryhope and Silksworth).

Abolition 
The seat was abolished for the 1983 general election as a result of the periodic review of parliamentary constituencies following the re-organisation of local government under the Local Government Act 1972. On abolition, Seaham and East Murton, which had been retained within the county of Durham and comprised about 40% of the electorate, were returned to the Easington constituency. The remainder, including Houghton-le-Spring and Hetton-le-Hole, was included in the new constituency of Houghton and Washington in the county of Tyne and Wear.

Members of Parliament

Elections

Elections in the 1880s

Elections in the 1890s

Elections in the 1900s

Elections in the 1910s 

General Election 1914–15:

Another General Election was required to take place before the end of 1915. The political parties had been making preparations for an election to take place and by the July 1914, the following candidates had been selected; 
Liberal: Thomas Wing
Unionist: 
Labour: W. P. Richardson

Elections in the 1920s

Elections in the 1930s

Election in the 1940s

Elections in the 1950s

Elections in the 1960s

Elections in the 1970s

See also 

 History of parliamentary constituencies and boundaries in Durham

Notes and References 
Notes

References

Constituencies of the Parliament of the United Kingdom established in 1885
Constituencies of the Parliament of the United Kingdom disestablished in 1983
Parliamentary constituencies in Tyne and Wear (historic)
Parliamentary constituencies in County Durham (historic)